85 class may refer to:

British Rail Class 85
DRG Class 85
New South Wales 85 class locomotive